Mian Kol (also Romanized as Mīān Kol) is a village in Chukam Rural District, Khomam District, Rasht County, Gilan Province, Iran. At the 2006 census, its population was 187, in 60 families.

References 

Populated places in Rasht County